Sir George Leonard Staunton, 1st Baronet (10 April 1737 – 14 January 1801) was an Anglo-Irish botanist, diplomat, physician, judge and planter who was an employee of the East India Company.

Life

George Leonard Staunton was born in Cargin, County Galway, Ireland, the son of Col. George Staunton. He was educated at the Jesuit College in Toulouse, France, obtaining an M.D. in 1758, and subsequently studied at the School of Medicine in Montpellier. He was awarded a DCL by the University of Oxford in 1790.

Staunton initially worked as a physician in the British West Indies, where he acquired slave plantations on Grenada and Dominica. He then switched to law and was made Attorney-General in Grenada in 1779. In 1784, he accompanied his lifelong friend George Macartney, 1st Earl Macartney, whom he first met in the West Indies, to Madras to negotiate peace with Tipu Sultan, for which service Staunton was created a baronet of Ireland, on 31 October 1785. He was elected in February 1787 a Fellow of the Royal Society.

In 1793, Staunton was named Secretary to the British mission to the Chinese Imperial court.  This diplomatic and trade mission would be headed by Lord Macartney.  While the Macartney Embassy returned to London without obtaining any concession from China, the mission brought back detailed observations. 

Staunton died at his London house, 17 Devonshire Street, on 14 January 1801 and was buried in Westminster Abbey, where a monument by Sir Francis Chantrey is erected to his memory. The baronetcy, his Irish estate at Clydagh, County Galway and his London home were all inherited by his only son, George Thomas Staunton.

Works
Staunton was charged with producing the official account of the Macartney Embassy, after their return. 
It was published 1797 under the title An Authentic Account of an Embassy from the King of Great Britain to the Emperor of China. This multi-volume work was taken chiefly from papers of Lord Macartney and Sir Erasmus Gower, Commander of the expedition. Sir Joseph Banks, the President of the Royal Society, was responsible for selecting and arranging engraving of the illustrations in this official record.

References

Citations

Bibliography

 Barrow, John. (1807).  Some Account of the Public Life, and a Selection from the Unpublished Writings, of the Earl of Macartney, 2 vols. London: T. Cadell and W. Davies.
 Cranmer-Byng, J. L. "Lord Macartney’s Embassy to Peking in 1793." Journal of Oriental Studies. Vol. 4, Nos. 1,2 (1957–58): 117–187.
 Esherick, Joseph W. "Cherishing Sources from Afar." Modern China Vol. 24, No. 2 (1998): 135–61.
 Hevia, James Louis. (1995).  Cherishing Men from Afar: Qing Guest Ritual and the Macartney Embassy of 1793. Durham: Duke University Press. 
 Peyrefitte, Alain. (1992). The Immobile Empire (Jon Rotschild, translator). New York: Alfred A. Knopf/Random House.  [https://books.google.com/books?id=xTF2AAAACAAJ&q=The+Immobile+Empire  Google Books]
 Peyrefitte, Alain. (1990). Images de l'Empire immobile ou le choc des mondes. Récit historique. Paris: Fayard.  (paper)
 Robbins, Helen Henrietta Macartney (1908). Our First Ambassador to China: An Account of the Life of George, Earl of Macartney with Extracts from His Letters, and the Narrative of His Experiences in China, as Told by Himself, 1737-1806, from Hitherto Unpublished Correspondence and Documents. London : John Murray. [digitized by University of Hong Kong Libraries, Digital Initiatives, "China Through Western Eyes." ]
 Rockhill, William Woodville.  "Diplomatic Missions to the Court of China: The Kotow Question I," The American Historical Review, Vol. 2, No. 3 (Apr., 1897), pp. 427–442.
 Rockhill, William Woodville.  "Diplomatic Missions to the Court of China: The Kotow Question II," The American Historical Review,'' Vol. 2, No. 4 (Jul., 1897), pp. 627–643.
 .
 

1737 births
1801 deaths
18th-century Irish botanists
Attorneys General of British Grenada
Staunton, George Leonard, 1st Baronet
Irish orientalists
Irish slave owners
Fellows of the Royal Society
People from County Galway